Noctuary  may refer to:
a song from Dial 'M' for Monkey (album)
a collection of short stories by American horror writer Thomas Ligotti